Dolores Vargas París, in full María Magdalena Dolores Vargas de París y Ricaurte (1800 – 1878). Young heroine of the independence of Gran Colombia, and wife of General Rafael Urdaneta, first lady of the republic between 1830 and 1831, born in Santa Fe in the year 1800. She was one of the daughters of the marriage between Ignacio de Vargas Tavera and María Ignacia París Ricaurte.

Act of Independence 

With just 15 years of age, Dolores lost her mother, who died on October 7, 1815, while giving birth to a son. A few months later, after the Viceroyalty of New Granada was reestablished with the reconquest of the United Provinces of New Granada by the Spanish Empire, her father and grandfather Jose Martin Paris Alvarez were taken to prison by order of General Pablo Morillo, leaving Dolores alone to take care of her two younger siblings: Jose Ignacio and Teresa. Demonstrating the strength that characterized many of her lineage, she presented herself before the courts in order to negotiate the liberation of her father and grandfather, in exchange for jewels and other very valuable objects that belonged to her family for generations; the value amounted to about 40,000 reales. The Spanish had recently reconquered the rebel nation, and as retribution to her family for having been part of those who had instigated revolts around the region, they took the jewels, but also hanged her father and sentenced her grandfather to death by firing squad. She was banished from the city and ordered to march to Facatativa with her grandmother Genoveva Ricaurte Mauris. This act earned her the title of heroine among the people of her city.

Years later, after the triumph of the patriot troops over the royalists at the Battle of Boyaca on August 7, 1819, the Santa Fe society organized an act of triumphal entry for the official victors. For the act, Dolores was designated to place the laurel crown on El Libertador, Simon Bolivar, since she was considered to be the most beautiful woman of Santa Fe, just like her mother and grandmother before her. She was also attributed with having "a strange sympathy and an extraordinary talent" in virtue of which she was made popular with the saying "ni por la mocha" ("not even for the mocha"), which means that a person will not take a determined action even for the love of the most beautiful woman (alluding to Dolores who in this case received the nickname mocha for being the daughter of El Mocho Vargas). Her father was popularly known by that nickname after assisting a dance with a shoe that was missing a tongue.

Urdaneta's Wife 

Dolores married Rafael Urdaneta in Santa Fe, Gran Colombia, on August 31, 1822. Before Gran Colombia was dissolved in 1831, the marriage had enjoyed much popularity. However, following the dissolution and the establishment of a dictatorship in the Republic of New Granada, they were forced to flee the country. Upon reaching Maracaibo, Venezuela, Urdaneta's native city, they suffered persecution from General Paez, who had been one of Bolivar's ideological adversaries after the end of the Venezuelan War of Independence. Urdaneta and Dolores had been extremely close and loyal friends to Bolivar so they were forced to flee again, this time to Curazao.

In 1832, they were able to return to Caracas through a license granted to the family by the government of Venezuela, but it conditioned her husband to not intervene in the politics of the country. The family moved to Santa Ana de Coro, where a revolt erupted against the government, which opened the doors for her husband to get involved in politics once again. He was eventually able to retain a position as a senator for a few years.

After experiencing a period of economic difficulties, Urdaneta was appointed ambassador of Venezuela in Spain on 1845, but was only able to retain that position for a month before dying due to complications from kidney stones. Dolores was able to survive with a pension approved by the Venezuelan congress, and she took care of her children until they were capable of attaining important positions in Venezuelan society.

She died in Caracas on October 28, 1878.

References 

1800 births
1878 deaths
People of the Colombian War of Independence
People of the Venezuelan War of Independence
Death in Caracas